Abdulla Afifa (Arabic: 
عبدالله عفيف; born 5 April 1991 is a Qatari footballer who plays as a midfielder  In the 2011–12 Qatar Stars League, he won the post-season award of Best Young Player.

Personal life
Born in Ar-Rayyan to Syed Taleb, Afifa started playing for the Al Rayyan SC youth teams from a young age. His father was an amateur football player, his uncle was part of the historic 1981 FIFA World Youth Championship in which Qatar finished runners-up, and his older brother was also a footballer who retired due to injury. He moved from Al Rayyan's youth teams to ASPIRE Academy in 2004, a year before it was officially inaugurated.

Honors

Individual
QFA Best Player U-23
Winner (1): 2012

References

External links
 QSL.com.qa profile
 Goalzz.com profile

1991 births
Living people
Qatari footballers
Al-Rayyan SC players
Al-Sailiya SC players
Al Ahli SC (Doha) players
Umm Salal SC players
Al Kharaitiyat SC players
Al-Markhiya SC players
Qatar Stars League players
Qatari Second Division players
Association football midfielders